A Lally column is a round  or square thin-walled structural steel column filled with concrete and oriented vertically to provide support to beams or timbers stretching over long spans.Lally columns are an engineered   Component and as such must be installed exactly as the  design engineer specified.

Fabrication

The steel shell of a Lally column is filled with concrete, which carries a share of the compression load, and helps prevent local buckling of the shell.  

The advantage of a Lally column over conventional structural steel is the ability to cut it to length on a construction site with simple hand tools such as a plumber's pipe cutter or a reciprocating saw. Lally columns are generally not as strong or durable as conventional structural steel columns. The term "lally column" is sometimes incorrectly used in reference to other types of prefabricated steel columns.

Invention
The Lally column is named after a U.S. inventor, John Lally, who owned a construction company that started production of these columns in the late 19th century.  He resided in Waltham, Massachusetts and Boston during the period 1898–1907.  He was issued four U.S. Patents on composite columns: #614729, #869869, #901453, and #905888. Pat. #869869 was assigned to the U.S. Column Company of Cambridge, Massachusetts.

Design development
Early Lally columns were made with structural steel, "standard" pipes, with wall thicknesses slightly less than 1/4".  Modern Lally columns are typically made with 16 ga. (approx. 0.06") shells.  Modern Lallies are therefore much lower in strength than the older ones (typically less than half the strength), and are also much more subject to damage by corrosion in moist environments.  

Modern Lally columns are primarily intended as somewhat stronger and more durable substitutes for wood posts in light-frame wood construction, although they are sometimes also used with steel beams.

References

 1 Adjustable Steel Columns, October home inspections

External links 
 Examples of Uses
  History of inventor John Lally
 Home Inspection maintenance

Structural engineering
Structural steel